Vatroslav Petrinović (born 13 April 1959 in Split) is a Croatian retired football defender, who played at the end of the 1970s and during the 1980s for Hajduk, Iskra, Admira, Budućnost Titograd, Šibenik and Olimpija. While playing for Hajduk he scored a goal in the UEFA Cup match against Metz played on 18 September 1985.

References

  at bundesliga
  at hajduk.hr
  at forum.b92.net
  Goal against Metz

Living people
1959 births
Association football defenders
Croatian footballers
FK Budućnost Podgorica players
HNK Hajduk Split players
NK Olimpija Ljubljana (1945–2005) players
FC Admira Wacker Mödling players
HNK Šibenik players
Expatriate footballers in Austria